Charles Omenihu (born August 20, 1997) is an American football defensive end for the Kansas City Chiefs of the National Football League (NFL). He played college football at Texas.

Early years
Omenihu attended Rowlett High School in Rowlett, Texas. He committed to the University of Texas to play college football.

College career
Omenihu played at Texas from 2015 to 2018. During his career, he had 115 tackles and 16.5 sacks, including 9.5 as a senior.  He was named Big 12 Defensive Lineman of the Year in 2018.

Professional career

Houston Texans
Omenihu was drafted by the Houston Texans in the fifth round (161st overall) of the 2019 NFL Draft.

San Francisco 49ers
On November 2, 2021, Omenihu was traded to the San Francisco 49ers for a 2023 sixth-round pick.

Kansas City Chiefs
Omenihu signed a two-year contract with the Kansas City Chiefs on March 16, 2023.

Legal troubles 
On January 24, 2023, Omenihu was arrested for misdemeanor domestic violence.

References

External links
Texas Longhorns bio

1997 births
Living people
Players of American football from Houston
American football defensive ends
Texas Longhorns football players
Houston Texans players
San Francisco 49ers players
Kansas City Chiefs players